The Apocalypse of Settler Colonialism: The Roots of Slavery, White Supremacy, and Capitalism in 17th Century North America and the Caribbean is a book by Gerald Horne. It is a historical analysis of the development of settler colonialism in North America and the Caribbean in the 17th century.  Sarah Barber from the Lancaster University Department of History reviews the book and concludes "Writing accessible history is never easy, and this is a laudable addition." David Waldstreicher, Professor of History at the Graduate Center of the City University of New York,  British colonizers committed counter-revolution—revolting against crown and against the threat from below—to increase their control over land and people.

Synopsis
The book argues that the emergence of settler colonialism in this period was driven by the need to solve the crisis of overproduction in Europe, which led to the creation of a new economic system based on slavery, white supremacy, and capitalism. Horne traces the roots of this system to the English Civil War and the colonization of Ireland, and shows how the exploitation of Native American and African labor was central to the development of the colonial economy.

Horne also examines the role of religion, specifically Puritanism, in the colonization process, arguing that the ideology of white supremacy was rooted in religious beliefs and used to justify the exploitation of non-white labor. He also explores the ways in which resistance to settler colonialism and slavery developed, including the actions of enslaved Africans, Native Americans, and European indentured servants.

Overall, Horne's book analyses the historical roots of settler colonialism and the interconnectedness of capitalism, white supremacy, and slavery in the colonial period.

See also 

 Settler colonialism
 White supremacy
 White nationalism

Further reading

 Bessis, Sophie (2003). Western Supremacy: The Triumph of an Idea? Zed Books.  
 Dunbar-Ortiz, Roxanne (2015). An indigenous peoples' history of the United States. Beacon Press, Boston. 
 Lindqvist, Sven (1996). Exterminate all the brutes. New Press, New York.

References

2018 non-fiction books
History books about colonialism
Non-fiction books about slavery
History books about the Caribbean